Agnes of Hesse-Kassel (14 May 1606 in Kassel – 28 May 1650 in Dessau) was a princess of Hesse-Kassel by birth and by marriage Princess of Anhalt-Dessau.

Life 
Agnes was a daughter of Landgrave Maurice of Hesse-Kassel (1572-1632) from his second marriage to Juliane of Nassau-Siegen (1587-1643), the daughter of Count John VII of Nassau-Siegen. She was raised together with her siblings. She spoke six languages and composed music.

On 18 May 1623 she married Prince John Casimir of Anhalt-Dessau (1596-1660). During the Thirty Years' War, she managed to soften the plight of Anhalt-Dessau by negotiating with the generals, both orally and in writing. She was considered a keen economist and mathematician. In 1645, she built a fortified house in Nischwitz, which was later developed into Oranienbaum Castle.

Issue 
From her marriage Agnes had the following children:
 Maurice (1624-1624)
 Dorothea (1625-1626)
 Juliane (1626-1652)
 John George II (1627-1693), who was Prince of Anhalt-Dessau from 1660 to 1693
 married in 1659 to Princess Henriette Catherine of Nassau (1637-1708)
 Louise (1631-1680)
 married in 1648 to Duke Christian of Brzeg (1618-1672)
 Agnes (1644-1644)

References 
August B. Michaelis: Einleitung zu einer volständigen Geschichte der Chur- und Fürstlichen Häuser ..., p. 624, Online
Christian August Wichmann: Geschichte berühmter Frauenzimmer, p. 741, Online

German princesses
House of Ascania
House of Hesse
1606 births
1650 deaths
17th-century German people
Daughters of monarchs